Christopher Brooking (c. 1553–1627), of Totnes, Devon, was an English politician.

He was a Member (MP) of the Parliament of England for Totnes in 1604.

References

1550s births
1627 deaths
Members of the Parliament of England (pre-1707) for Totnes
English MPs 1604–1611